The men's coxless pairs competition at the 1948 Summer Olympics took place at Henley-on-Thames, London.

Schedule

Results

Heats
First boat of each heat qualified to the semifinal, remainder goes to the repechage.

Heat 1

Heat 2

Heat 3

Heat 4

Repechage
First boat of each heat qualified to the semifinal.

Heat 1

Heat 2

Heat 3

Semifinal
First boat of each heat qualified to the final.

Heat 1

Heat 2

Heat 3

Final

References

External links
 Official Olympic Report

Rowing at the 1948 Summer Olympics